Ginge  may refer to:

 Ginge (pejorative), a pejorative term for people with red hair
 West and East Ginge, hamlets in Oxfordshire containing Ginge Manor
 Mai Ginge Jensen (b. 1984), Danish ten-pin bowler
 Jan Inge “Ginge” Berentsen Anvik (b. 1970), Norwegian composer

See also
 Ging (disambiguation)
 Gingee (disambiguation)
 Ginger (disambiguation)
 Gingy, a fictional character in the Shrek films
 Jinge Temple, a Buddhist temple in Shanxi province, China